Viktor Starčić (11 May 1901 – 1 June 1980) was a Serbian actor. He appeared in more than one hundred Yugoslav films from 1927 to 1981.

Filmography

References

External links 

1901 births
1980 deaths
Serbian male film actors